Rock 'Em Sock 'Em Robots Arena is a video game developed by Paradox and published by Mattel Interactive for the PlayStation in 2000.

Reception

The game received mixed reviews according to the review aggregation website Metacritic. David Chen of NextGen said that the game was "Neither dull as lead nor strong as steel." Shawn Sparks of GameRevolution found the concept of the game to be a "pretty nifty idea", but that it was poorly executed thanks to its outdated engine.

References

External links
 

2000 video games
Fighting games
North America-exclusive video games
PlayStation (console) games
PlayStation (console)-only games
Video games about robots
Video games based on Mattel toys
Video games developed in the United States